The AIM Independent Music Awards, hosted by the Association of Independent Music (commonly abbreviated to AIM), began in 2011. It is established through a collection of independent record labels and providing service and support to independent and smaller artists and record labels globally, achieving recognition for their efforts and works. The AIM Independent Music Awards are also providing recipients with greater opportunities to further expand their careers and name in the music industry.

About

The Association of Independent Music 
The Association of Independent Music is a non-profit organization initiated in March 1999 and the current AIM's CEO is Paul Pacifico which previously held titles as CEO of the Featured Artists' Coalition (commonly abbreviated to FAC) and President of the International Artists Organisation (commonly abbreviated to IAO), a professor at Berklee College of Music (Campus in Valencia, Spain) and also owns his own Independent music company. The trade body was initiated in order to represent smaller indie artists, bands and labels. The organization provides support, education, publicity and assistance to their members through music awards and festivals. The Association of Independent Music advocate"providing a collective voice for UK's independent music industry" and "supporting UK's independent music." The organisation has expanded and representing approximately eight hundred varying record labels, artists and companies of diverse sorts within the music industry. The organisation are also branching into other trade bodies, such as the Association of Independent Festivals.

The Association of Independent Festivals 
The Association of Independent Festivals (commonly abbreviated to AIF) are being a division of the AIM which are works with the direct aim of aiding independent festivals and labels. The aims of The Association of Independent Festivals is "represent, empower and provide a vital support network to independent festivals organizers." The trade body was initially founded in 2008 by DJ Robert John Gorham, more commonly known as Rob da Bank (who is also founder of annual music festival bestival '), and the director of bestival Ben Turner. The body currently represents approximately fifty member events.

2015 Awards winners 

|-
|rowspan=17  | 2015
|-
| Erased Tape Records || Best Small Label || 
|-
| Young Fathers-'White Men Are Black Too' || Best Difficult Second Album || 
|-
| Cities of Darkscorch Boardgame || Special Catalogue Release of the Year || 
|-
| Swans || Hardest Working Band of Artist|| 
|-
| Brainchild Festival || Golden Welly Award for Best Independent Festival || 
|-
| Wolf Alice || Independent Breakthrough of the Year || 
|-
| Marc Riley, BBC 6 Music || Indie Champion || 
|-
| Flying Lotus-'Never Catch Me' || Independent Video of the Year || 
|-
| All Time Low || 'Best Live Act || 
|-
| FKA twigs-'Two Weeks' || Independent Track of the Year || 
|-
| Jungle || PPL Award for Most Played New Independent Act || 
|-
| Enter Shikari-'The Mindsweep' || Independent Album of the Year || 
|-
| Transgressive Records || Independent Label of the Year || 
|-
| Digby Pearson || Pioneer Award || 
|-
| Peter Quicke, Matt Black and Jonathan More of Ninja Tune || Innovator Award || 
|-
| Skepta || Outstanding Contribution to Music || 
|-

2016 Awards winners 

|-
|rowspan=18 | 2016
|-
| Numbers || Best Small Label || 
|-
| Daughter, Not to Disappear || Best Difficult Second Album || 
|-
| Slade, When Slade Rocked the World || Special Catalogue Release of the Year || 
|-
| Darren Hayman || Hardest Working Band/Artist || 
|-
| Brainchild Festival || Golden Welly Award for Best Independent Festival || 
|-
| Christine and the Queens || Independent Breakthrough of the Year || 
|-
| Jon Tolley || Indie Champion Award || 
|-
| Oscar-Sometimes || Independent Video of the Year || 
|-
| Babymetal  || Best Live Act || 
|-
| Adele-Hello || Independent Track of the Year || 
|-
| Sigala || PPL Award for Most Played New Independent Act || 
|-
| Scott Gorham || Riff Lord Award || 
|-
| Stormzy || Innovator Award || 
|-
| Little Simz-A Curious Tale of Trials + Persons  || Independent Album of the Year || 
|-
| Epitaph/ANTI || Independent Label of the Year || 
|-
| Roisin Murphy || Outstanding Contribution to Music || 
|-
| Richard Russell, XL Recordings || Pioneer Award ||  
|-

2017 awards winners
Pioneer Award: Steve Beckett (Warp Records)
Outstanding Contribution to Music: The Dillinger Escape Plan
Innovator Award: Boy Better Know
Independent Label of the Year: Because Music
Independent Album of the Year: Stormzy – Gang Signs & Prayer
Most Played New Independent Act: Stormzy
Independent Video of the Year: DJ Shadow – "Nobody Speak" (featuring Run the Jewels)
Independent Track of the Year: The xx – "On Hold"
Indie Champion Award: Katie Riding and Joe Daniel (Independent Label Market)
Best Independent Festival: Lost Evenings
Best Difficult Second Album: Jlin – Black Origami
Special Catalogue Release of the Year: Lovely Creatures: The Best of Nick Cave and the Bad Seeds (1984-2014)
Hardest Working Group or Artist: Shao Dow
Independent Breakthrough of the Year: Sampha
Best Live Act: Counterfeit
Best Small Label: Planet Mu

2018 awards winners 
Independent Album of the Year: Nadine Shah – Holiday Destination
Independent Track of the Year: Peggy Gou – "It Makes You Forget (Itgehane)"
Best Sophomore Release: Let's Eat Grandma – I'm All Ears
UK Breakthrough of the Year: Jorja Smith
International Breakthrough of the Year: Phoebe Bridgers
Best Live Act: Erasure
Hardest Working Group or Artist: Idles
Outstanding Contribution to Music: Tracey Thorn
Pioneer Award: Goldie
Innovator Award: Sophie
Best Creative Packaging: Black Sabbath – The Ten Year War
Independent Label of the Year: Ninja Tune
Best Small Label: Black Acre Records
Indie Champion Award: Femi Adeyemi (NTS Radio)
Most Played New Independent Act: Dave
Independent Video of the Year: Novo Amor – "Birthplace" (Directors: Sil van der Woerd and Jorik Dozy)

2019 awards winners
Best Live Act: Gerry Cinnamon
Best Small Label: Scruff of the Neck
Best Creative Packaging: Various Artists, handpicked and curated in collaboration with The Rolling Stones – Confessin' the Blues
UK Independent Breakthrough: Idles
Outstanding Contribution to Music: Debbie Harry
Best Independent Album: Dave – Psychodrama
Best Difficult Second Album: Idles – Joy as an Act of Resistance
Most Played New Independent Artist: Freya Ridings
International Breakthrough: Jade Bird
Innovator Award: Allen Kovac
Best Independent Video: Hot Chip – "Hungry Child"
Best Independent Track: Dave – "Funky Friday" (featuring Fredo)
One to Watch: Georgia
Best Independent Label: Partisan Records
Pioneer Award: Johnny Marr
Indie Champion: Charles Caldas

2020 awards winners 
UK Independent Breakthrough: Moses Boyd
Best Creative Packaging: Digga D – Double Tap Diaries
Best Small Label: Speedy Wunderground
Best Independent Remix: Lafawndah – Tourist X Nídia Rework
One to Watch: Arlo Parks
Best Independent Video: The Howl & the Hum – "The Only Boy Racer Left on the Island"
Best Difficult Second Album: FKA twigs – Magdalene
International Breakthrough: Yaeji
Best Independent Album: Sarathy Korwar – More Arriving
Best Live Act: Five Finger Death Punch
Best Independent Track: Flying Lotus – "More" (featuring Anderson Paak)
Best Independent Label: Jazz re:freshed
Outstanding Contribution to Music: Tony Allen
Most Played New Independent Artist: Freya Ridings
Pioneer Award: Little Simz
Innovator Award: AJ Tracey
Special Recognition Award: Vince Clarke
Indie Champion: Helen Smith

2021 awards winners
UK Independent Breakthrough: Arlo Parks
International Breakthrough: Jayda G
Best Independent Track: Enny – "Peng Black Girls" (featuring Amia Brave)
Best Independent Album: Arlo Parks – Collapsed in Sunbeams
Best (Difficult) Second Album: Fontaines D.C. – A Hero's Death
Best Independent Remix: Ela Minus – "megapunk" (Elkka Remix)
One to Watch: Enny
Best Creative Packaging: Working Men's Club – Working Men's Club
Best Independent Video: Wesley Joseph – "Thrilla"
Best Independent Label: Forever Living Originals
Best Small Label: Strut Records
Most Played New Independent Artist: Lauv
Best Live (Streamed) Act: Ben Böhmer
Pioneer Award: Tricky
Innovator Award: Adrian Sherwood
Outstanding Contribution to Music: Joan Armatrading
Indie Champion: Love Record Stores Day and Bandcamp
Diversity Champion: Paulette Long

2022

References 

British music awards